The Serbia women's national rugby union team represents Serbia at rugby union. The side first played in 2007.

History

Results summary
(Full internationals only)

Results

Full internationals

External links
 Serbia and Montenegro on IRB.com
 Serbia and Montenegro on rugbydata.com
 Official site

Women's national rugby union teams
Rugby union in Serbia
Rugby union
European national women's rugby union teams